Ecquetot is a commune in the Eure department in northern France.

Population

International relations
Ecquetot is twinned with:
Cefn Cribwr in south Wales.

See also
Communes of the Eure department

References

Communes of Eure